Macrocypraea is a genus of large sea snails, cowries, marine gastropod mollusks in the family Cypraeidae, the cowries.

Species
Species within the genus Macrocypraea include:
Macrocypraea cervinetta (Kiener, 1843)
Macrocypraea cervus (Linnaeus, 1771)
Macrocypraea mammoth Simone & Cavallari, 2020
Macrocypraea zebra (Linnaeus, 1758)

References

 Petuch E.J. & Drolshagen M. (2011) Compendium of Florida fossil shells, volume 1. Wellington, Florida: MdM Publishing. 412 pp

External links
  Simone L.R.L. & Cavallari D.C. (2020). A new species of Macrocypraea (Gastropoda, Cypraeidae) from Trindade Island, Brazil, including phenotypic differentiation from remaining congeneric species. PLOS ONE. 15(1): e0225963.

Cypraeidae
Gastropod genera